was a Japanese collectible card game created by Bushiroad. The first products began releasing simultaneously worldwide from January 24, 2014.

On June 15, 2020, Bushiroad announced it would end production of the card game, with the final new product release occurring on September 25, 2020 and official tournaments continuing through June 2021.

An anime television series adaptation by OLM, Inc. and Dentsu began airing from January 4, 2014. An English version produced by Bushiroad and Ocean Productions is airing in Singapore as well as being streamed worldwide via YouTube. A manga adaptation was serialized in Shogakukan's CoroCoro Comic from November 2013 to April 2018. It was followed by a manga series Shin Future Card Buddyfight from May 2018 to February 2019. It is published in English by Shogakukan Asia. The English dub formerly aired in Canada.

The first season ended on April 4, 2015, and was followed by a sequel series, Future Card Buddyfight Hundred, which ran from April 11, 2015, to March 26, 2016. Future Card Buddyfight Hundred was followed by Future Card Buddyfight Triple D which ran from April 1, 2016 to March 24, 2017. After the airing of Future Card Buddyfight Hundred episode 25, it was announced on the official YouTube channel that all episodes from that point and onwards will be in Japanese only with English subtitles. It was followed by Future Card Buddyfight X, which ran from April 1, 2017 to March 31, 2018 and the dub resumed on April 15, 2017. Future Card Buddyfight X was followed by Future Card Buddyfight X: All-Star Fight which ran from April 7, 2018 to May 26, 2018. Future Card Buddyfight X: All-Star Fight was followed by Future Card Buddyfight Ace (Future Card Shin Buddyfight) which ran from June 2, 2018 to March 30, 2019.

The Future Card Buddyfight Ace anime series ended in April 2019 and continued in the monthly manga – Bessatsu CoroCoro Comic Special from April 30, 2019 to early 2020.

Future Card Buddyfight Ace was released on Kabillion on September 27, 2019. This is the first time that a Future Card Buddyfight series has aired on American television. The original anime would also be released on Kabillion.

In January 2020, the digital distribution rights to the franchise were acquired by Kidtagious Entertainment which has released the anime on multiple streaming platforms.

Characters

Original Generation

The main protagonist of the series. While his fate is unknown as he doesn't appear in Ace, he is mentioned in the beginning.

Hailing from the Dragon World, he is Gao Mikado's Buddy.

A prodigy Buddy Police.

Tasuku Ryuenji's Buddy.

Gao's friend and supporter.

Gao's friend and supporter.

Gao's rival.

Commentator.

Gao's little sister.

Buddy Police officer.

 Zanya's little brother.

New Generation

He is the main protagonist of the Ace anime and the son of Gao Mikado and Paruko Mikado, older brother of Haru, cousin of Ion Nanana, grandson of Takashi and Suzumi Mikado and great-grandson of Hanae Juumonji.

Yuga's best friend and the co-founder of RanGa Channel.

Anime series notes
In episode 4, characters from Cardfight!! Vanguard make special cameo appearances such as Aichi Sendou, Kamui Katsuragi, Ren Suzugamori, Toshiki Kai and Tetsu Shinjo. Misaki Tokura (who is voiced by Izumi Kitta in Japanese and Carol-Anne Day in English (both of whom also voice roles in the Japanese and English versions of Buddyfight) is the only one who has a spoken line.

Anime

The TV animation was released in Japan on TV Tokyo and affiliates on January 4, 2014, with the animation done by OLM, Inc. Bushiroad simulcasts an English dub in Singapore, Malaysia, and in North America through YouTube, Hulu, and Crunchyroll. Canada's Teletoon aired the English dub from January 8, 2015 to September 7, 2015. It returned to Teletoon from October 2015 to February 2016. As with their first series, Cardfight!! Vanguard, Bushiroad is airing the series in English on YouTube and Hulu. As of episode 17, the dub is also airing on Crunchyroll. The English airings are delayed from the Japanese airings by a few hours and are considered the same day simulcast, but due to the time difference between Japan and the States, the English airdate ends up being a day ahead of the Japanese airing. The English dub for Hundred went on a hiatus on October 2, 2015.

Trading card game

Products

Booster Pack
1 box of booster packs contains 30 booster packs. Each pack contains 5 random cards. The rarities of cards are categorized into Common (C), Uncommon (UC), Rare (R), Double Rare (RR), Triple Rare (RRR), Buddy Rare (BR) and Special Parallel (SP).

List of Booster Packs
BT01 – : Released on January 31, 2014
BT02 – : Released on April 5, 2014 
BT03 – : Released on July 4, 2014
BT04 – : Released on October 10, 2014
BT05 – : Released on January 30, 2015

List of Hundred Booster Packs
H-BT01 – Neo Enforcer Ver.E: Released on May 1, 2015
H-BT02 – Galaxy Burst: Released on July 17, 2015
H-BT03 – Assault of the Omni Lords: Released on October 16, 2015
H-BT04 – Mikado Evolution: Released on January 22, 2016

List of Triple D Booster Packs
BP-BT01 – Unleash! Impact Dragon!!: Released on April 15, 2016
BP-BT02 – Roar! Invincible Dragon!!: Released on July 22, 2016
BP-BT03 – Annihilate!! Great Demonic Dragon!!: Released on October 21, 2016
BT-BT04 – Shine! Super Sun Dragon!!: Released on December 23, 2016

List of Triple D Booster Pack Alternatives
BP-A01 – Buddy Rave: Released on June 24, 2016
BP-A02 – Four Dimensions: Released on September 23, 2016

List of Triple D Climax Booster Packs
CBT-01 – Dragon Fighters: Released on February 24, 2017

List of X Booster Packs
BP-X01 – The Dark Lord's Rebirth: Released on April 21, 2017
BP-X02 – Chaos Control Crisis: Released on July 14, 2017
BP-X03 – Overturn! Thunder Empire!: Released on October 20, 2017
BP-X04 – Rainbow Striker: Released on December 22, 2017

List of X Booster Pack Alternatives
CBT-A01 – Crossing Generations: Released on June 16, 2017
CBT-A02 – Evolution & Mutation: Released on August 25, 2017
CBT-A03 – LVL Up! Heroes & Adventurers!: Released on September 22, 2017
CBT-A04 – New World Chaos: Released on March 23, 2018

List of X Climax Booster Packs
CBT-01 – Driven to Disorder: Released on February 23, 2018

List of X2 Booster Packs
BP-X201 – Buddy Legends: Released on April 20, 2018

List of X2 Booster Pack Alternatives
BP-X2A01 – Solar Strife: Released on June 8, 2018

List of Ace Booster Packs
BP-A01 – Gargantua Awakened: Released on August 31, 2018
BP-A02 – Dimension Destroyer: Released on November 2, 2018
BP-A03 – Buddy Lineage: Released on December 14, 2018
BP-A04 – True Awakening of Deities: Released on January 11, 2019

List of Ace Ultimate Booster Packs
BP-AU01 – Superhero Wars Ω -Advent of Cosmoman!-: Released on September 14, 2018
BP-AU02 – Miracle Fighters ~Miko & Mel~: Released on September 14, 2018

List of Ace Climax Booster Packs
S-CBT01 – Golden Garga: Released on March 1, 2019
S-CBT02 – Violence Vanity: Released on March 1, 2019

Character Pack
1 box of character packs contains 30 character packs. Each pack contains 5 random cards. The rarities of cards are categorized into Common (C), Uncommon (U), Rare (R), Double Rare (RR), Triple Rare (RRR), Buddy Rare (BR), SECRET, and Special Parallel (SP)

List of Character Packs
CP01 – : Released on March 14, 2014

Extra Pack
1 box of extra packs contains 15 booster packs. Each pack contains 5 random cards. The rarities of cards are categorized into Common (C), Uncommon (UC), Rare (R), Double Rare (RR), Triple Rare (RRR), Buddy Rare (BR) and Special Parallel (SP).

List of Extra Packs
EB01 – : Released on June 6, 2014
EB02 – : Released on September 12, 2014

List of Hundred Extra Packs
H-EB01 – Miracle Impack!: Released on June 12, 2015
H-EB02 – Shadow Hero: Released on August 14, 2015
H-EB03 – Lord of Hundred Thunders: Released on September 25, 2015
H-EB04 – Buddy Allstars+: Released on December 18, 2015

Perfect Pack
1 box of perfect packs contain 10 perfect packs. Each pack contains 6 random cards. The rarities of cards are categorized into Double Rare (RR), and Buddy Rare (BR). The RR cards are in a golden print.

List of Perfect Packs
PP01 – Golden Buddy Pack Ver.E: Released on March 6, 2015

List of Hundred Perfect Packs
H-PP01 – Terror of the Inverse Omni Lords: Released on February 26, 2016

Start Deck
A pre-constructed starter deck contains 52 pre-set cards. Life counter, rule book, and playmat are included as well.

List of Triple D Start Decks
SD01 – Scorching Sun Dragon: Released on March 4, 2016
SD02 – Cross Dragoner: Released on March 4, 2016
SD03 – Hollow Black Dragon: Released on March 4, 2016

List of X Start Decks
SDX01 – Demon Dragon Lord of Tempest: Released on April 21, 2017
SDX02 – Dragon Fielder: Released on April 21, 2017

List of S Start Decks
SDS01 – Dradeity: Released on July 27, 2018
SDS02 – Triangulum Galaxy: Released on July 27, 2018
SDS03 – Spiral Linkdragon Order: Released on July 27, 2018

Trial Deck
A pre-constructed trial deck contains 52 pre-set cards. Life counter, rule book, and playmat are included as well.

List of Trial Decks
TD01 – : Released on January 24, 2014
TD02 – : Released on January 24, 2014
TD03 – Dragonic Force: Released on March 28, 2014
TD04 – Braves Explosion: Released on July 4, 2014
TD05 – Ninja Onslaught: Released on July 4, 2014
TD06 – Dark Pulse: Released on October 10, 2014
TD07 – Tomorrow! Asmodai: Released on January 23, 2015

List of Hundred Trial Decks
H-SD01 – Crimson Fist: Released on April 24, 2015
H-SD02 – Radiant Force: Released on April 24, 2015
H-SD03 – Dragonic Star: Released on July 10, 2015
H-SD04 – Malicious Demons: Released on July 10, 2015

List of Triple D Trial Decks
H-TD01 – Dragon Emperor of the Colossal Ocean: Released on July 15, 2016

List of Triple D Special Series Decks
H-SS03 – Golden Buddy Champion Box: Released on December 2, 2016

List of X Trial Decks
X-TD01 – Decimating Black Dragon: Released on July 14, 2017
X-TD02 – Ruler of Havoc: Released on July 14, 2017
X-TD03 – Thunderous Warlords Alliance: Released on October 20, 2017

List of X Special Series Decks
X-TD04 – Duel Chest: Released on December 8, 2017

List of Ace Special Series Decks
A-SS01 – Lost Dimension: Released on October 5, 2018
A-SS02 – 3 Garga Decks! Impact! Triple Punisher: Released on December 7, 2018

List of Ace Trial Decks
S-TD01 – Draknight: Released on April 26, 2019

Organized Play
Support for the organized play program is provided by Bushiroad.
Tournaments and workshops are available in Europe, the United States and Asia-Oceania region. A special promotional card is given to participants of the workshops or tournaments.

Organizers of the events are given a choice between a best-of-1 format and a best-of-3 format for the monthly sanctioned tournaments.

Lawsuit
On January 8, 2021, it was announced Bushiroad is currently suing Future Card Buddyfight creator Yoshimasa Ikeda and his company Studio Ikecchi for disseminating confidential information about the franchise and copyright infringement and credibility damage to the company. Ikeda had continuously used images from Future Card Buddyfight without Bushiroad's permission.

References

External links
 
 
 
 
 
 
 

2014 anime television series debuts
2015 anime television series debuts
2016 anime television series debuts
2017 anime television series debuts
2018 anime television series debuts
Japanese children's animated action television series
Japanese children's animated science fiction television series
Bushiroad
Card games introduced in 2014
Collectible card games
Card games in anime and manga
OLM, Inc.
IG Port franchises
Shogakukan franchises
Shogakukan manga
Shōnen manga
Xebec (studio)